Seaside Plantation, also known as the Edgar Fripp Plantation, is a historic plantation house located on Saint Helena Island near Beaufort, Beaufort County, South Carolina. It was built about 1795 to 1810, and is a two-story, frame dwelling in a transitional Georgian / Federal style.  It features one-story hip roofed portico. Seaside was one of the plantations participating in the Port Royal Experiment and had as its labor superintendent Charles Pickard Ware (1840–1921). Charlotte Forten Grimké (1837-1914) also resided at Seaside Plantation. Along with Tombee Plantation, Seaside is one of only a few remaining antebellum plantation houses on St. Helena. Also on the property are the contributing original, brick-lined well, a clapboard shed, a large barn with clapboard siding and tin roof, and a round concrete and oyster shell silo.

It was listed in the National Register of Historic Places in 1979.

References

African-American history of South Carolina
Plantations in South Carolina
Plantation houses in South Carolina
Houses on the National Register of Historic Places in South Carolina
Georgian architecture in South Carolina
Federal architecture in South Carolina
Houses completed in 1810
Houses in Beaufort, South Carolina
National Register of Historic Places in Beaufort County, South Carolina